The 2015–16 Khuzestan Premier League season  was the 16th season of the Khuzestan Premier League which took place from September 25, 2015 to March 17, 2016 with 14 teams competing from the province of Khuzestan. Teams played home and away with one another each playing 26 matches. Persepolis Shush finished the season on top of the standings and was promoted to division 3 of the Iranian football system. Meanwhile, finishing in last place, Yaran Abadan will be relegated to the Khuzestan Division 1 league.

Teams

Final standings

Results

See also 

 2015–16 Azadegan League
 2015–16 League 2
 2015–16 League 3
 2015–16 Hazfi Cup
 2015 Iranian Super Cup

References 

Khuzestan Premier League
1
Iran